Leptaxis caldeirarum is a species of air-breathing land snails, terrestrial pulmonate gastropod mollusks in the family Helicidae, the typical snails. 

The status of this species is uncertain.  

This species is endemic to Portugal.

Description
The length of the shell attains 10.4 mm.

References

Conchologiae Azoricae prodromus novarum specierum diagnoses sistens. Journal de Conchyliologie 6: 148-153
 Bank, R. A.; Neubert, E. (2017). Checklist of the land and freshwater Gastropoda of Europe. Last update: July 16th, 2017

External links
 

Molluscs of the Azores
Endemic fauna of the Azores
Leptaxis
Gastropods described in 1857
Taxonomy articles created by Polbot